James Patrick McEwan (September 24, 1952 – June 14, 2014) was an American slalom canoeist who competed in the 1970s and then again in the 1980s and early 1990s. He teamed up with his son Devin to compete in the 2000s. Competing in two Summer Olympics, he won a bronze medal in the C1 event at Munich in 1972.

McEwan was born in Olney, Maryland and began kayaking at his family's Valley Mill Camp. He earned a degree in literature from Yale University in 1975. He was married to children's author and illustrator Sandra Boynton, a fellow Yale graduate (class of 1974).

With his partner, Lecky Haller, McEwan won a silver medal in the C2 slalom at the 1987 ICF Canoe Slalom World Championships in Bourg St.-Maurice. He and Haller placed fourth in the 1992 Summer Olympics. They have also won the overall World Cup title in the C2 category in the inaugural season of this competition in 1988.

In 1998 McEwan and his brother Tom were members of an expedition to run the Tsangpo Gorge, considered the "Mount Everest" of rivers. The expedition encountered unanticipated high water and ended in tragedy when teammate Doug Gordon failed to boof a waterfall, missed his roll, and died.

McEwan wrote many children's books. In 2009 he was diagnosed with Multiple myeloma after suffering back problems and died on June 14, 2014.

World Cup individual podiums

Bibliography
 Jamie McEwan and Sandra Boynton (1988). Story of Grump and Pout. Knopf Books for Young Readers. .
 Jamie McEwan and Victor Kennedy (2004). Willy the Scrub. Darby Creek Publishing. .
 Jamie McEwan and John Margeson (2005). Whitewater Scrubs. Darby Creek Publishing. .
 Jamie McEwan and Victor Kennedy (2007). Rufus the Scrub Does Not Wear a Tutu. Darby Creek Publishing. .
 Jamie McEwan and Sandra Boynton (2002). The Heart Of Cool. Simon Spotlight. .
 Jamie McEwan and Victor Kennedy (2004). Willy the Scrub. Darby Creek Publishing. .
 Jamie McEwan and John Margeson (2008). Scrubs Forever!. Darby Creek Publishing. ASIN B001TL2O5S.
 Jamie McEwan and John Margeson (2007). Rufus the Scrub Does Not Wear a Tutu. Darby Creek Publishing. .

Books about James McEwan 
 Wickliffe Walker (2000). Courting the Diamond Sow : A Whitewater Expedition on Tibet's Forbidden River. National Geographic Society. ASIN B001TL2O5S.
 Todd Balf (2001). The Last River: The Tragic Race for Shangri-la . Three Rivers Press. .

References

External links
Official website

1952 births
2014 deaths
American male canoeists
Canoeists at the 1972 Summer Olympics
Canoeists at the 1992 Summer Olympics
Olympic bronze medalists for the United States in canoeing
Yale University alumni
People from Olney, Maryland
International whitewater paddlers
Deaths from multiple myeloma
Medalists at the 1972 Summer Olympics
Medalists at the ICF Canoe Slalom World Championships